Lovrin (formerly Lorandhausen; , formerly Lóránthalma) is a commune in Timiș County, Romania. It is composed of a single village, Lovrin. It also included three other villages – Gottlob, Tomnatic and Vizejdia – until 2004, when they were split off to form Gottlob and Tomnatic communes.

The commune itself is a significant railway junction served by local railway lines radiating in five directions. It is an agro-industrial and urban center for the surrounding region. Until the early 1990s the majority of inhabitants were of German descent but emigration has significantly reduced their numbers.

History 

Lovrin was documented in 1466 as Lóránthalma. Later it was also known as Lóránt or Lórántfalva. In 1529 it was looted by the Turks, which led to the refuge of the population for a while. In 1564 the village is recorded as private property of the bishop of Cenad. It began to be repopulated and was inhabited by Serbs who were still living here in 1582. A period of decline followed again, with the settlement almost deserted. The repopulation took place only after 1760. At that time Lovrin was part of the Nagykikinda District and was subject to the military administration that had been established in Banat after the expulsion of the Turks in 1717. Bulgarian settlers first came here, who changed its name to Lovrinac.

Between 1785–1792, the first German colonizations are recorded, with Swabians brought from Cenad and other Banat localities. They have received numerous privileges to indigenous peoples, which is why communities of Serbs and Bulgarians were forced to leave. In 1792, Lovrin, along with Gottlob, were gifted by Emperor Leopold II to General Anton Lipthay, for special merits in the battles against the Turks. General Lipthay built a mansion here that still bears his name today.

Lovrin experienced an industrial boom in the 19th century, several small factories opening here. Some of them include the brewery (1846–1870), the iron foundry (1924–1944) and the dressing factory. Between 1940–1944, canned vegetables were fabricated for the Wehrmacht; the factory was closed immediately after 1944. The German majority remained until the agrarian reform of 1945. Between 1951–1956, 434 people were deported from Lovrin to Bărăgan. After 1989–1991 most of the remaining emigrated, their place being taken by the Romanian population.

Demographics 

Lovrin had a population of 3,223 inhabitants at the 2011 census, down 10% from the 2002 census. Most inhabitants are Romanians (88.4%), larger minorities being represented by Roma (3.41%), Germans (2.36%) and Hungarians (1.27%). For 3.41% of the population, ethnicity is unknown. By religion, most inhabitants are Orthodox (79.34%), but there are also minorities of Roman Catholics (8.25%) and Pentecostals (7.88%). For 3.57% of the population, religious affiliation is unknown.

Notable people 
  (1821–1899), composer
  (1826–1913), composer
  (1848–1918), church musician
  (1849–1918), composer
  (1876–1966), politician
  (1923–1995), historian
 Edda Buding (1936–2014), tennis player
  (b. 1938), art historian and writer
 Ilse Buding (b. 1939), tennis player
 Ingo Buding (1942–2003), tennis player
  (b. 1943), writer and visual artist
 Richard Wagner (b. 1952), novelist
  (b. 1960), psychologist
 Ioan Almășan (b. 1962), football goalkeeper

References 

Communes in Timiș County
Localities in Romanian Banat